Amerigo C.M. Thodé (born 27 July 1950) is a Curaçaoan politician of the Movement for the Future of Curaçao (MFK). He served as President of the Estates of Curaçao between November and December 2012 and once again from 24 March 2017 and 11 May 2017.

Career
In the 2000s Thodé served as secretary-general of the Party Workers' Liberation Front 30 May (FOL). He later switched to Movement for the Future of Curaçao. At the first meeting of the Estates of Curaçao on 10 October 2010 Thodé was elected Vice President. On 2 November 2012 Thodé was elected President of the Estates. After a new government coalition did not include Thodé's MFK he resigned as President of the Estates on 6 December 2012.

In January 2016 Thodé was convicted of leaking confidential information from a meeting from the College of Financial Oversight. He subsequently shared this information on a radio show and in an MFK press conference. Thodé was sentenced to a conditional fine of 1400 Netherlands Antillean guilder. An appeal verdict at the Joint Court of Justice of Aruba, Curaçao, Sint Maarten, and of Bonaire, Sint Eustatius and Saba in December 2016 resulted in the same sentence. He appealed at the Supreme Court of the Netherlands on 4 January 2017. In March 2019 the Attorney General at the Supreme Court stated that there was a legal ground to convict Thodé. In October 2019 Thodé lost his appeal.

For the 2016 elections Thodé held the fifth position on the MFK list. As the MFK obtained four seats he did not enter the Estates.

When Gilmar Pisas became Prime Minister in March 2017 Thodé returned to the Estates on 24 March and once more became President. William Millerson took over the Presidency on 11 May 2017.

References

1950 births
Living people
Members of the Estates of Curaçao
Movement for the Future of Curaçao politicians
Party Workers' Liberation Front 30 May politicians
Presidents of the Estates of Curaçao